United States Soldiers' and Airmen's Home National Cemetery, in Washington, D.C., is located next to the U.S. Soldiers' and Airmen's Home. It is one of only two national cemeteries administered by the Department of the Army, the other being Arlington National Cemetery. The national cemetery is adjacent to the historic Rock Creek Cemetery and to the Soldiers' Home.

Background

Immediately after the Battle of Bull Run, the Commissioners of the United States Military Asylum offered six acres of land at the north end of the their grounds as a burial ground for soldiers and officers. This land had been part of the land sold by George Washington Riggs when the asylum was established.

Currently, the only people eligible to be buried at the cemetery are residents of the U.S. Soldiers' and Airmen's Home.

Notable interments
The cemetery is the final resting place for more than 14,000 veterans, starting with those that fought in the Civil War.
 Thomas Boyne (1849–1896), Buffalo Soldier in the Indian Wars, sergeant, and Medal of Honor recipient
 Benjamin Brown (1859–1910), Buffalo Soldier in the Indian Wars, sergeant, and Medal of Honor recipient
 John Denny (1846–1901), Buffalo Soldier in the Indian Wars, sergeant, and Medal of Honor recipient
 Henry Jackson Hunt (1819–1889), Union Army chief of artillery, and artillery general of The Army of the Potomac in the American Civil War
 John C. Kelton (1828–1893), Adjutant Brigadier General of the U.S. Army from 1889 to 1892
 John A. Logan (1826–1886), Union Army major general in the American Civil War, 1884 Republican vice presidential nominee, Illinois senator (1871–77 & 1879–86) and Illinois representative (1859–62 & 1867–71)
 David S. Stanley (1828–1902), Union Army major general in the American Civil War and Medal of Honor recipient
 Agnes von Kurowsky (1892–1984), an American nurse during World War I who was the basis for the character "Catherine  Barkley" in A Farewell to Arms

See also
 President Lincoln and Soldiers' Home National Monument

References

External links
 
 
 United States Soldiers and Airmens Home National Cemetery at BillionGraves

Soldiers' and Airmen's Home National Cemetery
Cemeteries in Washington, D.C.